Mohammed Osman (born 1 January 1994) is a Syrian footballer who plays for a Thai League 1 club Lamphun Warriors as an attacking midfielder. He is known for his strong and precise shots.

Club career
Born in Qamishli, Syria, to a Kurdish family, Osman joined Vitesse's youth setup in 2008, aged 15, after starting it out at DVV. On 5 July 2013, he signed his first professional contract with the club. On 22 May 2015, Osman signed a new one-year contract with the club, being definitely promoted to the main squad. He made his first team – and Eredivisie – debut on 14 August, coming on as a late substitute in a 3–0 home win against Roda JC. On 6 September 2017, it was announced that Vitesse had terminated Osman's contract.

On 11 September 2017, Osman joined Eerste Divisie side Telstar following his release from Vitesse.

On 10 September 2021, he returned to the Netherlands and signed with Sparta Rotterdam. On 11 January 2022, Sparta and Osman agreed to terminate the contract. On 28 June 2022, he signed with Lamphun Warriors, after he agreed to terminate the contract with  Sparta Rotterdam.

International career
Osman was born in Syria, but raised in the Netherlands. He represented the Netherlands U16 in the 'Val de Mar Tournoi' in 2009.

He started his international career with Syria on the 6th of September 2018 in a friendly match against Uzbekistan, he played the whole 90 minutes.

International goals 
Scores and results list Syria's goal totally first.

Career statistics

Honours

Club
Vitesse
 KNVB Cup: 2016–17

References

External links
 
 Vitesse official profile 
 Vitesse Jeugd profile 
 

1994 births
Living people
People from Qamishli
Syrian footballers
Syrian expatriate footballers
Syria international footballers
Dutch footballers
Netherlands youth international footballers
Syrian emigrants to the Netherlands
Dutch people of Syrian descent
Syrian Kurdish people
Association football midfielders
Eredivisie players
Eerste Divisie players
Qatar Stars League players
SBV Vitesse players
SC Telstar players
Heracles Almelo players
Al Kharaitiyat SC players
Sparta Rotterdam players
Mohammed Osman
2019 AFC Asian Cup players
Syrian expatriate sportspeople in Qatar
Expatriate footballers in Qatar